The Memphis, Paris, and Gulf Depot is a historic railroad station on Arkansas Highway 27 in Mineral Springs, Arkansas.  It is a modest single-story wood-frame structure, with a gable roof.  The east elevation has a projecting bay, which housed the telegrapher's office, and a double-width loading entrance.  The west side of the building has loading platforms and another double-wide entrance.  It was built in 1908 by the Memphis, Paris and Gulf Railroad, a short-lived regional railroad whose objective was to connect Memphis, Tennessee to Paris, Texas, and is the first and only railroad depot to be built in the town.

The depot was listed on the National Register of Historic Places in 1978.

See also
Memphis, Paris and Gulf Railroad Depot in Ashdown, Arkansas
National Register of Historic Places listings in Howard County, Arkansas

References

Railway stations on the National Register of Historic Places in Arkansas
Railway stations in the United States opened in 1908
Transportation in Howard County, Arkansas
National Register of Historic Places in Howard County, Arkansas
1908 establishments in Arkansas
Former railway stations in Arkansas